Burr is a 1973 historical novel by Gore Vidal that challenges the traditional Founding Fathers iconography of United States history, by means of a narrative that includes a fictional memoir by Aaron Burr, in representing the people, politics, and events of the U.S. in the early 19th century. It was a finalist for the National Book Award in 1974. 

Burr is chronologically the first book of the seven-novel series Narratives of Empire, with which Vidal examined, explored, and explained the imperial history of the United States; chronologically, the six other historical novels of the series are Lincoln (1984), 1876 (1976), Empire (1987), Hollywood (1990), Washington, D.C. (1967), and The Golden Age (2000).

Description 

Burr (1973) portrays the eponymous anti-hero as a fascinating and honorable gentleman, and portrays his contemporary opponents as mortal men; thus, George Washington is an incompetent military officer, a general who lost most of his battles; Thomas Jefferson is a fey, especially dark and pedantic hypocrite who schemed and bribed witnesses in support of a false charge of treason against Burr, to whom he almost lost the presidency in the 1800 United States presidential election; and Alexander Hamilton is a bastard-born, over-ambitious opportunist whose rise in high politics was by General Washington's hand, until being fatally wounded in the Burr–Hamilton duel (July 11, 1804).

The enmities were established, when, despite Burr's initial victory in the voting, the presidential election of 1800 was a tied vote in the Electoral College, between him and Thomas Jefferson. To break the tied electoral vote, the House of Representatives—dominated by Alexander Hamilton—voted thirty-six times, until they elected Jefferson as the U.S. President, and, by procedural default, named Burr as the U.S. Vice President.

The contemporary story of political intrigue occurs from 1833 to 1840, in the time of Jacksonian democracy, years after the treason trial. The narrator is Charles Schermerhorn Schuyler, an ambitious young man working as a law clerk in Aaron Burr's law firm, in New York City. Charlie Schuyler is not from a politically-connected family, and is ambivalent about politics and about how law is practiced. Hesitant about taking the examination for admission to the bar, Schuyler works as a newspaper reporter, all the while dreaming of becoming a successful writer, so that he can emigrate from the U.S. to Europe.

Important to the intrigues of the plotters are the allegation that Vice President Martin Van Buren is the bastard son of Aaron Burr; the veracity or falsity of that allegation; and its usefulness in high-government politics. Because Van Buren is a strong candidate for the 1836 United States presidential election, his political enemies, especially a newspaper publisher, enlist Schuyler to glean personally embarrassing facts about Van Buren from the aged Burr, a septuagenarian man in 1834.

Tempted with the promise of a fortune in money, Schuyler thinks about writing a pamphlet proving that Vice President Van Buren is an illegitimate son of Burr, and so end Van Buren's political career. Schuyler is torn between honoring Burr, whom he admires, and betraying him to gain much money, and so take the woman he loves to a new future in Europe. At story's end, Charlie Schuyler has learned more than he had expected about Aaron Burr, about Martin Van Buren, and about his own character, as a man in the world, as Charles Schuyler.

As in the novels Messiah (1954), Julian (1964), and Creation (1981), the colonial people, their times, and the places of Burr (1973) are presented through the memoirs of a character in the tale. Throughout the story, the narrative presents thematic parallels to The Memoirs of Aaron Burr (1837), co-written with Matthew Livingston Davis. Many of the incidents of story and plot in Burr are historical: Thomas Jefferson was a slaver who fathered children with some of his slave women; the Continental Army General James Wilkinson was a double agent for the Kingdom of Spain; Alexander Hamilton regularly was challenged to a duel, by most every political opponent who felt slandered by him; and Aaron Burr was tried for and acquitted of treason against the U.S., consequent to the Burr Plot (1807) for an empire in the south-western territories of the country.

In the "Afterword" to Burr, Vidal states that, in most instances, the actions and words of the historical characters represented are based upon their personal documents and historical records. Moreover, besides challenging the traditionalist, mythical iconography of the Founding Fathers of the United States, the most controversial aspect of the novel Burr is that Alexander Hamilton gossiped that Burr and his daughter, Theodosia, practiced incest—which character assassination led to their mortal duel; killing Hamilton ended the public life of Aaron Burr.

Narrative frame 
The novel comprises two storylines. One gives us Charles Schuyler's personal and professional perspectives on early mid-19th-century New York, and his coming to know the titular character Aaron Burr in his later, quieter years. The other gives us, by means of Burr's recollections as read and recorded by Schuyler, his experience of late eighteenth century British colonial life and the independence struggle or "Revolution" (in the section called 1833); and most substantially, his experience of life in post-Independence New York and his participation in the political development of the American Republic (through the main section of the novel, 1834), thus:

 1834
 Chapter Ten: Memoirs of Aaron Burr — One
 Chapter Eleven: Memoirs of Aaron Burr — Two
 Chapter Twelve: Memoirs of Aaron Burr — Three, and Memoirs of Aaron Burr — Four
 Chapter Thirteen: Memoirs of Aaron Burr — Five
 Chapter Fourteen: Memoirs of Aaron Burr — Six
 Chapter Fifteen: Memoirs of Aaron Burr — Seven
 Chapter Eighteen: Memoirs of Aaron Burr — Eight, and Memoirs of Aaron Burr — Nine
 Chapter Nineteen: Memoirs of Aaron Burr — Ten
 Chapter Twenty: Memoirs of Aaron Burr — Eleven
 Chapter Twenty-one: Memoirs of Aaron Burr — Twelve
 Chapter Twenty-five: Memoirs of Aaron Burr — Thirteen
 Chapter Twenty-seven: Memoirs of Aaron Burr — Fourteen
 Chapter Twenty-eight: Memoirs of Aaron Burr — Fifteen
 Chapter Thirty-two: Memoirs of Aaron Burr — Sixteen
 Chapter Thirty-four: Memoirs of Aaron Burr — Seventeen
 Chapter Thirty-six: Memoirs of Aaron Burr — Eighteen

 1835
 Chapter Two: Memoirs of Aaron Burr — Nineteen
 Chapter Five: Memoirs of Aaron Burr — Twenty
 Chapter Seven: Memoirs of Aaron Burr — Twenty-one

List of characters 
Vidal notes in the novel's afterword that each character named therein "actually existed," with the exception of its narrator, Charlie Schuyler, and William de la Touche Clancey, a thinly veiled satire of longtime Vidal critic William F. Buckley Jr. The sections of the novel that deal with the narrator's activity in the 1830s (as opposed to Burr's reminiscences of his adventures in the American Revolution through his trial for treason) focus on the political life of New York City during the end of the administration of President Andrew Jackson. This list of characters includes those that appear or are mentioned in the novel by its narrator, in order of appearance or mention.

 Charles Schuyler - Law clerk in Aaron Burr's law office, narrator
Aaron Burr - New York City attorney, former Vice President
Eliza Jumel - Burr's second wife; reputed to be the richest woman in New York City
Dr. Bogart - Elderly friend of Burr
Nelson Chase - Burr's law clerk, married to Mary Eliza Chase 
Mary Eliza Chase - Niece of (rumored to be daughter of) Eliza Jumel
William Legget - Subeditor of Evening Post
William Cullen Bryant - Assistant Editor of Evening Post, poet
Martin Van Buren - Vice President of the United States under President Andrew Jackson
Henry Clay - Senator, candidate for President (mentioned)
Richard Johnson - Senator from Kentucky, potential reform candidate for President (mentioned)
Mr. Craft - Burr's law office clerk
Matthew L. Davis - Editor, Tammany Hall insider, Burr's official biographer
Sam Swartwout - Collector of the Port of New York, appointed by President Jackson
Rosanna Townsend - Madam
Helen Jewett - Prostitute
Aaron Columbus Burr - Burr's illegitimate son, silversmith
Edwin Forrest - Actor
William de la Touche Clancy - Publisher of The American
Edmund Simpson - Owner of the Park Theater (mentioned)
Tom Hamblin - Manager of the Bowery Theater (mentioned)
Ephraim [No Last Name] - Ferryman, son of Burr's Revolutionary War comrade
James Madison - Former President of the United States, friend of Burr (mentioned)
John Marshall - Former Chief Justice of the United States, presiding judge in Burr's treason trial, cousin of Thomas Jefferson (mentioned)
Washington Irving - Novelist and journalist, acquaintance of Burr
Gulian Verplanck - Anti-Tammany mayoral candidate for New York CIty
Fitz-Greene Halleck - Poet, secretary to John Jacob Astor
John Jacob Astor - Financier
Mordecai Noah - Former Sheriff of New York City
Thomas Skidmore - Proto-socialist reformer
Charles Baldwin - Glutton
Alexander Hamilton Jr. - Lawyer, son of Burr's rival (mentioned)
Edward Livingston - Congressman
Reverend Peter Williams - Pastor of African Episcopal Church on Centre Street, NYC
Arthur and Lewis Tappan - Abolitionist leaders
Mrs. Redman - Boardinghouse proprietress
Reginald Gower - Printer and bookstore owner
Mrs. Keese (formerly Mrs. Overton) - Burr's landlady
Robert Wright - Philadelphia publisher of Davy Crockett
Colonel Davy Crockett - Congressman from Tennessee
George Orson Fuller - Phrenologist
Richard Robinson - Male prostitute, accused murderer
John Ogden Edwards - Judge, Burr's cousin
Pantaleone - Butler at American Consulate in Amalfi
Donna Carolina de Traxler - Wife of Charles Schuyler

References 

1973 American novels
American historical novels
Novels by Gore Vidal
Novel
Novels set in the early national era United States
Random House books
Cultural depictions of George Washington
Cultural depictions of Thomas Jefferson
Cultural depictions of Andrew Jackson
Cultural depictions of Martin Van Buren
Cultural depictions of Alexander Hamilton